Portrait of Lucas Cranach the Elder is a 1550 oil on panel portrait of Lucas Cranach the Elder. It is inscribed "Aetatis Suae LXXVII". It entered the Uffizi as a self-portrait, but was later re-attributed as a painting by his son, Lucas Cranach the Younger. It is still in the Uffizi, whilst a copy of it with some variants is now in the Staatkirche in Weimar.

References

1550 paintings
Cranach
Cranach
Paintings in the collection of the Uffizi
Paintings by Lucas Cranach the Younger